WHLN (1410 AM) is a radio station broadcasting an adult contemporary format. Licensed to Harlan, Kentucky, United States, the station is owned by Eastern Broadcasting Company, Inc., as of August 29, 2019.  It carries programming from ABC Radio and AP Radio, as well as from the Kentucky Sports Network.

References

External links

HLN
Harlan County, Kentucky
Mainstream adult contemporary radio stations in the United States
1941 establishments in Kentucky
Radio stations established in 1941